Adelina Dorina Pastor (born 5 May 1993) is a Romanian sprinter specialising in the 400 metres. She competed in the 4 × 400 metres relay at the 2016 IAAF World Indoor Championships winning a bronze medal. She also represented her country at the 2013 World Championships and two previous editions of the World Indoor Championships. Her personal bests in the 400 metres are 52.44 seconds outdoors (Tampere 2013) and 53.22 seconds indoors (Istanbul 2015).

Competition record

1Disqualified in the final

References

External links
 
 
 
 

1993 births
Living people
Romanian female sprinters
Place of birth missing (living people)
World Athletics Championships athletes for Romania
Olympic athletes of Romania
Athletes (track and field) at the 2016 Summer Olympics
World Athletics Indoor Championships medalists
Olympic female sprinters